Touching is the sixth album led by jazz pianist Paul Bley featuring tracks recorded in Copenhagen in 1965 and released on the Danish Fontana label.

Reception

AllMusic awarded the album 3 stars stating "Although not all that memorable, the playing by the trio is at a high level and it is interesting to hear Paul Bley's mid-'60s avant-garde improvising style which offered a contrast to the more dense playing of Cecil Taylor".  The Penguin Guide to Jazz said "The playing was superb... Carter and Altschul offer solid support but the focus is on the piano".

Track listing

Personnel 
Paul Bley - piano
Kent Carter - bass  
Barry Altschul - drums

References 

1965 albums
Paul Bley albums
Fontana Records albums